Oscar Acosta (1933-2014) was a Honduran writer. 

He was born in Tegucigalpa in 1933. He came to notice in the 1950s and 1960s, with his short stories and poetry collections. Among his works were: 
 "Responso al cuerpo presente de José Trinidad Reyes" (1955) 
 "El Arca" (1956)
 "Poesía Menor" (1957)
 "Tiempo Detenido" (1962)
 "Poesía, selección" (1952-1965)
 "Mi país" (1971)
 "Poesía, antología personal" (1971) 
 "Escrito en piedra" (anthology, 2002).

In 1964, he published an essay on the Honduran writer Rafael Heliodoro Valle, to which he added later works such as "Anthology of the New Honduran Poetry" with the poet Roberto Sosa, "Honduran Poetry Today", and "Anthology of the Honduran Short Story".

He ran the literary sections of the newspapers "El Día", now defunct, and "El Heraldo". He was also a founder of Editorial Nuevo Continente, and the magazines "Extra" and "Presente".

As a diplomat, Acosta represented his country in the Honduran legations in Spain, Italy, Peru and the Vatican. In 2000, when he was director of the Honduran Academy of Language, he nominated the Tegucigalpa-born Guatemalan writer Augusto Monterroso for the Prince of Asturias Award. 

Acosta died in July 2014 in Tegucigalpa, at the age of 81.

References

Honduran writers
1933 births
2014 deaths